Triphylite is a lithium iron(II) phosphate mineral with the chemical formula LiFePO4. It is a member of the triphylite group and forms a complete solid solution series with the lithium manganese(II) phosphate, lithiophilite. Triphylite crystallizes in the orthorhombic crystal system. It rarely forms prismatic crystals and is more frequently found in hypidiomorphic rock. It is bluish- to greenish-gray in color, but upon alteration becomes brown to black.

Etymology and history 
The mineral was first discovered and examined in 1834 by German mineralogist Johann Nepomuk von Fuchs at Hennenkobel Mine in the Bavarian Forest. The name derives from the Greek words tri ("three") and phulon ("family"), referring to the three cations found in natural samples of triphylite (Li+, Fe2+, Mn2+).

Crystal Structure 

Triphylite crystallizes in an orthorhombic crystal system. The lithium coordinates to six oxygen atoms in a distorted octahedron. Likewise, the iron centers are octahedrally coordinated. The structure contains isolated phosphate tetrahedra.

Properties 
Triphylite is soluble in hydrochloric and sulfuric acid. Under a blowpipe, it melts to form a dark gray, magnetic ball. Over time, the mineral undergoes alteration by oxidation, increasing the oxidation state of iron from +2 to +3 and allowing the lithium to escape, forming heterosite, FePO4.

Triphylite forms a complex solution series with lithiophilite, LiMnPO4, so that natural sources of triphylite usually contain manganese. The structures of members within this series are similar to olivine-type silicates.

References

Lithium minerals
Iron(II) minerals
Phosphate minerals
Orthorhombic minerals
Minerals in space group 62